René Eckardt (born 22 February 1990) is a German professional football midfielder who plays for ZFC Meuselwitz.

Career
Born in Jena, Thuringia, Eckardt began his career SV Lobeda 77 before 1998 moving to the youth from FC Carl Zeiss Jena in October 2008 was promoted to the first team. He played 7 games before he scored his first goal on 22 November 2008 against Stuttgarter Kickers.

International career
On 27 August 2009, Eckardt earned his first call up for Germany U-20 national team for a friendly game against Austria U-20.

References

External links
 
 
 Jena Profile

Living people
1990 births
Sportspeople from Jena
People from Bezirk Gera
German footballers
Footballers from Thuringia
Germany youth international footballers
Association football midfielders
FC Carl Zeiss Jena players
ZFC Meuselwitz players
3. Liga players
Regionalliga players